The northern hopping mouse (Notomys aquilo) is a species of rodent in the family Muridae. It is found only in coastal northern Australia, from Arnhem Land to the Cobourg Peninsula.

This mouse weighs 25 to 30 grams and is brown above and white below. Its long tail measures 150% of its body length and it has long hind feet up to 4 centimeters long.

This species lives in sandy soils on heathlands and grasslands. It is nocturnal. It consumes seeds and sometimes other plant material and invertebrates. The mouse hops, leaving bipedal tracks. Several individuals live communally in burrows.

Threats to this species include habitat alteration, such as changes in the fire regime and the effects of livestock. Feral cats watch the burrows and may consume several individuals in a night.

References

External links

Notomys
Rodents of Australia
Mammals of the Northern Territory
Mammals of Queensland
Endangered fauna of Australia
Mammals described in 1921
Taxa named by Oldfield Thomas
Taxonomy articles created by Polbot